Anna Kaaleste (née Mukhina; 17 January 1930 – 16 July 2014) was a Soviet cross-country skier. She competed in the women's 10 kilometres at the 1956 Winter Olympics. Kaaleste was married to  Estonian sprint canoeist Mikhail Kaaleste.

Cross-country skiing results

Olympic Games

References

External links
 

1930 births
2014 deaths
Soviet female cross-country skiers
Olympic cross-country skiers of the Soviet Union
Cross-country skiers at the 1956 Winter Olympics
Sportspeople from Saint Petersburg